Luiz Pereira ( 1961 – 8 March 2022) was a Brazilian paralympic athlete who competed mainly in category THW4 throwing events.

Pereira was part of the Brazilian team that travelled to Barcelona for the 1992 Summer Paralympics. There he competed in all three throws, finishing ninth in the discus throw, seventh in the javelin throw, and winning in the shot put.

Pereira died on 8 March 2022, at the age of 60.

References

External links
 

1960s births
2022 deaths
Paralympic athletes of Brazil
Paralympic gold medalists for Brazil
Paralympic medalists in athletics (track and field)
Athletes (track and field) at the 1992 Summer Paralympics
Medalists at the 1992 Summer Paralympics
Brazilian male discus throwers
Brazilian male javelin throwers
Brazilian male shot putters
20th-century Brazilian people
21st-century Brazilian people